Boris Samuel Mityagin (Борис Самуилович Митягин, born 12 August 1937, Voronezh) is a Russian-American mathematician.

Mityagin received in 1961 his candidate degree (Ph.D.) under Georgiy Shilov at the Moscow State University and in 1963 his Russian doctorate (higher doctoral degree). He was a researcher at the Central Economic Mathematical Institute of the Soviet Academy of Sciences. In 1979 he became a professor at Ohio State University.

His research deals with functional analysis and mathematical physics (spectra of Schrödinger and Dirac operators).

In 1966 in Moscow he was (with A. Pełczyński) an Invited Speaker of the ICM.

In 1960 he received the prize of the Moscow Mathematical Society. He was elected a Fellow of the American Mathematical Society.

Selected publications
 Approximate dimension and bases in nuclear spaces, Russian Mathematical Surveys, vol. 16, 1961, pp. 59–127
 with Albert S. Schwarz: Functors in categories of Banach spaces, Russian Mathematical Surveys, vol. 19, 1964, pp. 65–127
 An interpolation theorem for modular spaces, Matematicheskii Sbornik, vol. 108, 1965, pp. 473–482
 The homotopy structure of the linear group of a Banach space, Russian Mathematical Surveys, vol. 25, 1970, pp. 59–103
 Equivalence of bases in Hilbert spaces, Studia Mathematica, vol. 37, 1971, p. 111
 with G. M. Henkin: Linear problems of complex analysis, Russian Mathematical Surveys, vol. 26,  1971, pp. 99–164
 Notes on mathematical economics, Russian Mathematical Surveys, vol. 27, 1972, pp. 1–19
 with M. I. Kadets: Complemented subspaces in Banach spaces, Russian Mathematical Surveys, vol. 28, 1973, pp. 77–95
 with E. M. Semenov: Lack of interpolation of linear operators in spaces of smooth functions, Mathematics of the USSR-Izvestiya, vol. 11, 1977, pp. 1229–1266
 Quadratic pencils and least-squares piecewise-polynomial approximation, Math. Comp., vol. 40, 1983, pp. 283–300 
 with I. Aharoni and Bernard Maurey: Uniform embeddings of metric spaces and of Banach spaces into Hilbert spaces, Israel Journal of Mathematics, vol. 52, 1985, pp. 251–265
 with Vitaly Bergelson and : Unitary Z d-actions with continuous spectrum, Proc. Amer. Math. Soc., vol. 119, 1993, pp. 1127–1134 
 with Thomas Kappeler: Gap estimates of the spectrum of Hill's equation and action variables for KdV. Trans. Amer. Math. Soc., vol. 351, 1999, 619–646 
 with Thomas Kappeler: Estimates for periodic and Dirichlet eigenvalues of the Schrödinger operator, SIAM journal on mathematical analysis, vol. 33, 2001, pp. 113–152
 Spectral expansions of one-dimensional periodic Dirac operators, Dyn. Partial Diff. Eq., vol. 1, 2004, pp. 125–191
 with Plamen Diakov: Instability zones of periodic 1-dimensional Schrödinger and Dirac operators, Russian Mathematical Surveys, vol. 61, 2006, p. 663

References

External links
Boris Mityagin, Ohio State University
mathnet.ru

20th-century Russian mathematicians
21st-century Russian mathematicians
20th-century American mathematicians
21st-century American mathematicians
Moscow State University alumni
Ohio State University faculty
Fellows of the American Mathematical Society
1937 births
Living people